Blastocladia aspergilloides is a species of fungus in the family Blastocladiaceae.

External links
 MycoBank entry

Fungi described in 1937
Blastocladiomycota